The Sri Lanka swallow (Cecropis hyperythra) is a resident breeder endemic to Sri Lanka.  It is closely related to the red-rumped swallow, and was formerly considered a subspecies.

Description 
It is a large swallow with a tail which forks deeply, and the combination of deep rufous underside and navy blue rump without any marks is a unique feature of this species. Its rufous underside can be used to tell it apart from the red-rumped swallow. It is a passerine, which means it has three toes pointing forward and one pointing backward, allowing it to perch.

Habitat 
It is found in a variety of open country habitats in both the lowlands and foothills in Sri Lanka, including farm fields and lightly wooded areas.

Behaviour 
It usually lives in pairs or small groups.

References
Rasmussen, P.C., and J.C. Anderton. 2005. Birds of South Asia. The Ripley guide. Volume 2: attributes and status. Smithsonian Institution and Lynx Edicions, Washington D.C. and Barcelona

Sri Lanka swallow
Endemic birds of Sri Lanka
Sri Lanka swallow
Sri Lanka swallow